Effiat Mbioto is a village in the Etinan local government area of Akwa Ibom State.

References 

Villages in Akwa Ibom